Safe Water Network is a nonprofit organization co-founded in 2006 by actor and philanthropist Paul Newman along with other civic and business leaders. The organization was founded to help address the evidence gap in off-grid water systems. Today Safe Water Network works with the private and public sectors to overcome the obstacles to local sustainability and scale. They empower communities, work with national, regional and local government authorities in India and Ghana, as well as partner with NGOs and private sector foundations and companies. With offices in Accra, New Delhi and New York, Safe Water Network oversees field initiatives to develop and refine models that can be taken to scale. They also foster best practices through publications, workshops and other events. Some of their partners include: Merck & Co, PepsiCo Foundation, Conrad N. Hilton Foundation and Newman's Own Foundation.

See also 
 Newman's Own Foundation

References

External links
 Safe Water Network Web Site

Non-profit organizations based in New York City
Organizations established in 2006
Charities based in New York City
Development charities based in the United States
Water-related charities
2006 establishments in New York City